Paramoron is a genus of longhorn beetles of the subfamily Lamiinae, containing the following species:

 Paramoron diadematum (Heller, 1910)
 Paramoron singulare Aurivillius, 1908

References

Pteropliini